The 13th Tejano Music Awards were held in 1993. They recognized accomplishments by musicians from the previous year. The Tejano Music Awards is an annual awards ceremony recognizing Tejano music musicians.

Award winners

Vocalists of The Year 
Male Vocalist of The Year
David Marez
Female Vocalist of The Year
Selena

Vocal Duo Of the Year 
Emilio Navaira and Raul Navaira

Albums of the Year 
Orchestra (Entre a Mi Mundo by Selena)
Progressive (Unsung Highways by Emilio Navaira)
Traditional (Right on Track by La Tropa F)

Songs of The Year 
Song of The Year
Lo Voy Hacer Por Ti by Mazz
Single of The Year
Lo Voy Hacer Por Ti by Mazz
Tejano Country Song of The Year
She's Not Alone by David Lee Garza y Los Musicales

Entertainers of the Year 
Male Entertainer of The Year
Emilio Navaira
Female Entertainer of The Year
Selena

Most Promising Band of The Year 
Culturas

Showband of The Year 
David Lee Garza y Los Musicales

See also 
Tejano Music Awards

References 

Tejano Music Awards
Tejano Music Awards by year
Tejano Music Awards
Tejano Music Awards